Coleophora spargospinella is a moth of the family Coleophoridae. It is found in Mongolia.

References

spargospinella
Moths of Asia
Moths described in 1974